Yeni Cumhuriyet is a village in the Oğuzeli District, Gaziantep Province, Turkey.

References

Villages in Oğuzeli District